Berloz is a municipality of Wallonia located in the province of Liège, Belgium. 

On January 1, 2006, Berloz had a total population of 2,781. The total area is 14.49 km² which gives a population density of 192 inhabitants per km².

The municipality consists of the following districts: Berloz, Corswarem, and Rosoux-Crenwick.

References

External links
 

Municipalities of Liège Province